Dominik Meffert and Tim Pütz were the defending champions, but decided not to compete.

Grégoire Burquier and Alexandre Sidorenko won the title, defeating Andriej Kapaś and Yasutaka Uchiyama in the final, 6–3, 6–4.

Seeds

Draw

Draw

References
 Main Draw

Open Harmonie mutuelle - Doubles
2015 Doubles